Karsten Lennart Jensen (born 10 April 1950) is a Danish former footballer who played as a defender. He made two appearances for the Denmark national team in 1973.

References

External links
 

1950 births
Living people
Danish men's footballers
Association football defenders
Denmark international footballers
Eerste Divisie players
AaB Fodbold players
FC Groningen players
Danish expatriate men's footballers
Danish expatriate sportspeople in the Netherlands
Expatriate footballers in the Netherlands